Harald Ettl (born 7 December 1947 in Gleisdorf, Styria) is an Austrian politician who served as a Member of the European Parliament from 1996 until 2009. He is a member of the Social Democratic Party, which is part of the Party of European Socialists.

During his time in Parliament, Ettle served on the Committee on Employment and Social Affairs. He was also a substitute for the Committee on Economic and Monetary Affairs, a member of the delegation to the EU–Bulgaria Joint Parliamentary Committee, and a substitute for the delegation for relations with the Mashreq countries.

Education 

 1968: Diploma from higher technical education institute

Career 

 1969-1971: Technical employee
 1971-1973: Trade union secretary
 Secretary-General (1973-1984) and President (1984-2000) of the Textile, Clothing and Leather Workers' Union
 since 2000: Vice-President of the Metal and Textile Union
 since 2004: Vice-President of the International Textile, Clothing and Leather Workers' Association
 1978-1989: Vice-Chairman of the General Accident Insurance Institution (AUVA)
 1978-1989: Chairman of the accident insurance committee, Main Association of Austrian Social Insurance Institutions
 1987-1999: Chairman of the EU Committee, Austrian Federation of Trade Unions
 1989-1992: Federal Minister for Health, the Public Service, Sport and Consumer Protection
 1993-2001: Chairman of the Consumer Information Association
 1995-1996: Member of the Economic and Social Committee of the European Communities
 1996-2009: Member of the European Parliament

External links 

 
 

1947 births
Living people
Social Democratic Party of Austria MEPs
MEPs for Austria 1999–2004
MEPs for Austria 1996–1999
MEPs for Austria 2004–2009